Marijana Rajčić (born 15 March 1989) is a retired soccer and Australian rules football player. She played soccer professionally for Adelaide United in the W-League and Australian rules football for Adelaide Football Club in the AFL Women's (AFLW).

Soccer career
Prior to taking up Australian rules football, Rajcic had had previously played soccer with Adelaide United in the Australian W-League. Prior to that she had played fully professionally for Gustafs GoIF in the Elitettan for the 2012 season, and played for Box Hill United in the Victorian Women's Premier League when she returned to soccer after knee surgery. She considers captaining Adelaide United in 2015 the best achievement in her soccer career.

AFL Women's
Rajčić was drafted by Adelaide Football Club with their fourth selection and 32nd overall in the 2017 AFL Women's draft after just one season with Norwood Football Club in the South Australian National Football League's Statewide Super Women's League. She previously took up the sport on the advice of a friend and in doing so followed the example of fellow dual-code players Brianna Davey, Ellie Brush and Jenna McCormick. In January 2023, Rajcic announced her retirement.

Personal life
In 2020, Rajčić competed on The Amazing Race Australia 5 with Chelsea Randall as a "stowaway team". In post-show interviews, the two revealed that they had started dating before filming began. She is of Croatian descendant.

References

External links

Australian women's soccer players
Living people
Adelaide United FC (A-League Women) players
A-League Women players
1989 births
Women's association football forwards
Adelaide Football Club (AFLW) players
Australian rules footballers from South Australia
The Amazing Race contestants
Lesbian sportswomen
Australian LGBT sportspeople
LGBT players of Australian rules football